Matthew Francis Holt (May 28, 1977 – April 15, 2017) was an American singer, formerly of alternative/nu metal band Nothingface and Kingdom of Snakes.

Biography 
Matt Holt was raised in the suburbs of Gaithersburg, Maryland, and Germantown, Maryland, north of Washington, D.C. During high school he met Tommy Sickles through mutual friends. Holt, Sickles, and two other friends formed the band Ingredient 17, in which he played guitar and sang. After playing a show with a band known as Nothingface, the two bands became familiar with one another.

Holt died in his Frederick, Maryland, home on April 15, 2017, at the age of 39 after years of battling an undisclosed degenerative illness.

Career

Early years 
Ingredient 17 was later recording in Nothingface bassist Bill Gaal's studio when Nothingface's vocalist, David Gabbard, left the band citing musical differences. One day Holt came in to record a song for Ingredient 17, and the band members of Nothingface liked his voice, so they "took" him from his band and got their new singer, Holt, says Tom Maxwell from the forums.

Nothingface 
After releasing four studio albums – Pacifier, An Audio Guide to Everyday Atrocity, Violence, and Skeletons – Nothingface disbanded on February 10, 2004. Shortly after, Holt joined a band called Kingdom of Snakes, formed by Bill Gaal, former bass player of Nothingface. Holt later left the band to pursue other musical routes.

In December 2005, Nothingface released new music on their website, which revealed that Holt, Maxwell and Sickles had been working together for a while. Joined by Danzig's bass player, Jerry Montano (who played with the band for a while in 2000 after Bill Gaal temporarily left the band), Nothingface began preparing a fifth studio album.

On May 24, 2008, it was announced through Blabbermouth.net as well as the band's Myspace page that original members Bill Gaal and Chris Houck (percussion) had rejoined Nothingface. Two days later they released Nothingface in remastered form (released in vinyl at first, the digital download for the entire album came later on April 30, 2009.) This was their very first effort before Pacifier.

In February 2009, Nothingface reunited in a studio in Baltimore, Maryland. Over the course of a few weeks, they recorded instrumentals for three new songs. Later, Holt entered the studio to lay down vocals for one of the new tracks: "One Thousand Lies".

On August 13, 2009, Maxwell announced he was leaving Nothingface and stated that Holt had not produced material. Hours later Gaal confirmed that the group had split up.

References

External links 

American heavy metal singers
Nu metal singers
Nothingface members
Alternative metal musicians
People from Gaithersburg, Maryland
People from Germantown, Maryland
1977 births
2017 deaths